Alexandria Loutitt (born 7 January 2004) is a Canadian ski jumper. She is the Canada’s first ever world champion in ski jumping and the first Canadian woman to win a World Cup ski jumping event.

Loutitt trains in Slovenia, as the ski jumping facility at the Canada Olympic Park in Calgary was shut down.

Career
Loutitt competed in four events at the FIS Nordic World Ski Championships 2021, finishing 46th on the normal hill, 38th on the large hill, 11th on the women's team normal hill and 10th in the mixed team normal hill. In December 2021, Loutitt had her season's best performance on the World Cup circuit with a 14th-place finish in the large hill event in Lillehammer.

In January 2022, Loutitt was named to Canada's 2022 Olympic team. On 7 February, Loutitt won the bronze medal as part of Canada's entry into the mixed team competition. This was Canada's first ever Olympic medal in ski jumping. In March 2022, Loutitt would win the bronze medal at the 2022 Nordic Junior World Ski Championships in the women's normal hill event.

In January 2023, Loutitt won the normal hill event at the World Cup stop in Zaō, Japan. This marked the first ever victory for a Canadian woman in the competition. The next month, she also became the first Canadian woman to win a world junior title in ski jumping, taking the individual normal hill gold in front of home fans in Whistler, British Columbia. In March, Loutitt became the first-ever Canadian ski jumping world champion, winning the women's large hill event at the FIS Nordic World Ski Championships 2023 in Planica, Slovenia.

However, her record was surpassed the next day by Ema Klinec.

Major tournament results

Winter Olympics

FIS Nordic World Ski Championships

World Cup

Standings

Individual wins

Individual starts

References

External links
 

2004 births
Living people
Sportspeople from Calgary
Canadian female ski jumpers
Olympic bronze medalists for Canada
Ski jumpers at the 2022 Winter Olympics
Olympic ski jumpers of Canada
Medalists at the 2022 Winter Olympics
Olympic medalists in ski jumping
FIS Nordic World Ski Championships medalists in ski jumping
Canadian expatriate sportspeople in Slovenia
21st-century Canadian women